Boschert Glacier is a glacier to the southeast of Hayden Peak, flowing southwest from Bear Peninsula into Dotson Ice Shelf, on Walgreen Coast, Marie Byrd Land. It was mapped by the United States Geological Survey (USGS) from U.S. Navy aerial photographs taken 1966, and named in 1977 by the Advisory Committee on Antarctic Names after Ralph G. Boschert, USGS cartographer, a member of the USGS satellite surveying team at South Pole Station, winter party 1975.

References
 

Glaciers of Marie Byrd Land